Merlen is a surname. Notable people with the surname include:

 Jean Baptiste Merlen (1769–1850), French engraver and medalist
 Jean Baptiste van Merlen (1772–1815), Dutch-Belgian army officer
 Jocelyn Merlen (born 1972), French footballer

See also
 Merle (surname)